Auguste-Louis de Rossel de Cercy (22 June 1736 – 27 February 1804) was a French Navy officer and painter of the 18th century. He especially painted naval scenes.

Biography
Cercy was born in Dompierre-sur-Mer in 1736 from an aristocratic family. He joined the French Navy as a Garde-Marine in 1751 in Rochefort. In 1752, he was appointed to Friponne. In 1754, he transferred on the 50-gun Aigle, and the year after on the 64-gun Inflexible. In 1756, he served first on the frigate Aquilon, and then on the 80-gun Duc de Bourgogne, and the year after on the 64-gun Saint Michel.

From 1759, Cercy served on the frigates Aragon, Sardaigne and Oiseau, before transferred to the ship Content.

In 1765, Cercy was promoted to Lieutenant. The year after, he served on Coulisse. In 1770, he was first officer on the 64-gun Bizarre.

In 1773, he was made a Knight in the Order of Saint Louis.

In 1775, he was appointed to the frigate Zéphir.

In 1779, he retired with the rank of captain. He started painting around that time. In 1778, he illustrated the action of 17 June 1778 between Belle Poule and HMS Arethusa, the action of 15 February 1783 between Concorde and HMS Magnificent. The year after, he painted the action of 17 August 1779 between Junon and Gentille against HMS Ardent, and the Battle of Martinique.  He also painted the Battle of Martinique of 1780.

At the Salon de la Correspondance in 1786, he showed landscapes of Malta and Constantinople. That same year, Louis XVI decided to have depictions of the French naval victories of the War of American Independence made, and he chose Cercy to make them.

He died in 1804 in Paris.

Notes, citations, and references
Notes

Citations

References

 
 
 
 

External links
 Works by Auguste-Louis de Rossel de Cercy

18th-century French painters
French male painters
French Navy officers
19th-century French painters
1736 births
1804 deaths
19th-century French male artists
18th-century French male artists